Classified as a "conversion disorder" by the DSM-IV, a psychogenic disease is a disease in which mental stressors cause physical symptoms of different diseases. The manifestation of physical symptoms without biologically identifiable causes results from disruptions of processes in the brain from psychological stress. During a psychogenic disease, neuroimaging has shown that neural circuits affecting functions such as emotion, executive functioning, perception, movement, and volition are inhibited. These disruptions become strong enough to prevent the brain from voluntarily allowing certain actions (e.g. moving a limb). When the brain is unable to signal to the body to perform an action voluntarily, physical symptoms of a disease are presented even though there is no biological identifiable cause. Examples of diseases that are believed by many to be psychogenic include psychogenic seizures, psychogenic polydipsia, psychogenic tremor, and psychogenic pain.

The term psychogenic disease is often used in a similar way to psychosomatic disease. However, the term psychogenic usually implies that psychological factors played a key causal role in the development of the illness. The term psychosomatic is often used in a broader way to describe illnesses with a known medical cause where psychological factors may nonetheless play a role (e.g., asthma can be exacerbated by anxiety).

Diagnosis 
With the advent of medical screening technologies, such as electroencephalography (EEG) monitoring, psychogenic diseases are becoming much more common as medical professionals have increasingly precise tools to monitor patients. When a patient does not display typical markers of a disorder that could show up from medical exams, physicians typically diagnose a patient's symptoms as being psychogenic. Research into understanding psychogenic disorders has led to the development of both electronic diagnostic tests for ruling out the usual biological markers of a disorder and new clinical observation procedures. An example of something a physician would look for when testing for psychogenic symptoms is if the symptom changes with suggestion (e.g. a patient is told to use a tuning fork to aid symptoms in a movement disorder).

Despite the understanding of psychogenic symptoms, there are some problems with the assumption that all medically unexplained illness must have a psychological cause. It remains possible that genetic, biochemical, electrophysiological, or other abnormalities may be present which we do not have the technology or background to identify. Some patients may also have their symptoms diagnosed as psychogenic even with a lack of evidence to suggest there are psychological causes. Misdiagnoses of psychogenic disease may be simply accidental, but they can also come from bias. For example, a doctor with a bias towards men may tell women that their symptoms are psychogenic, despite them being actual symptoms for a physical disease. This would then be contrasted with a man experiencing the same symptoms being treated differently, with the physical disease being detected.

See also

Functional symptom
Habit cough
Mass psychogenic illness
Psychogenic amnesia
Psychological trauma
Psychoneuroimmunology

References

Further reading
 Lim, Erle C. H.; Seet, Raymond C. S. (2007). "What Is the Place for Placebo in the Management of Psychogenic Disease?". Journal of the Royal Society of Medicine. 100 (2): 60–61. doi:10.1258/jrsm.100.2.60. PMC 1790983. PMID 17277261.
 Sykes, Richard (2010). "Medically Unexplained Symptoms and the Siren 'Psychogenic Inference'". Philosophy, Psychiatry, & Psychology. 17 (4): 289–299. doi:10.1353/ppp.2010.0034. ISSN 1086-3303
 Jannini, E. A., McCabe, M. P., Salonia, A., Montorsi, F., & Sachs, B. D. (2010). Controversies in sexual medicine: Organic vs. psychogenic? The Manichean diagnosis in sexual medicine. The journal of sexual medicine, 7(5), 1726–1733.
 Colligan, M. J. (1981). Mass psychogenic illness: Some clarification and perspectives. Journal of Occupational Medicine, 23(9), 635–638.
 Bransfield, R. C., & Friedman, K. J. (2019, December). Differentiating Psychosomatic, Somatopsychic, Multisystem Illnesses and Medical Uncertainty. In Healthcare (Vol. 7, No. 4, p. 114). Multidisciplinary Digital Publishing Institute.

Behavioural sciences
Types of mental disorders
Mind–body interventions